Joy Wilkinson is a British screenwriter, playwright, author, and director.

Early life
Wilkinson was born in Burnley, Lancashire. At age 14, she co-wrote Fried Eggs & Fag Ends, a play at the Lancashire Young Writers Festival that got reviewed in The Guardian by David Ward. She worked as a journalist before winning the Verity Bargate Award.

Career
Wilkinson has written several plays, such as Britain’s Best Recruiting Sergeant, Fair and The Sweet Science of Bruising, which opened at Southwark Playhouse in 2018. In 2015, she was announced as a Screen Daily Star of Tomorrow for her thriller screenplay, Killer Résumé, which landed her on the 2014 Brit List. She adapted Qiu Xiaolong's Inspector Chen Cao for BBC Radio 4, as well as several Agatha Christie adaptations. Among them were Ordeal by Innocence, Sparkling Cyanide and The Pale Horse . In 2021, she wrote an adaptation of Hope Mirrlees' Lud-in-the-Mist for BBC Radio 4.

On television, Wilkinson wrote for Doctors, Holby City, Casualty, and Land Girls. In 2012, Wilkinson adapted The Life and Adventures of Nicholas Nickleby as a five-part miniseries for BBC One. In 2018, she contributed the eighth episode of the eleventh series of Doctor Who, The Witchfinders. Wilkinson would novelise her episode as part of the Target Collection, and later wrote the short story The Simple Things. She wrote the comic strip Black Powder for Doctor Who Magazine in 2021. She co-wrote the fourth episode of The Watch, which is inspired by the Ankh-Morpork City Watch from the Discworld series of fantasy novels by Terry Pratchett. On March 17, 2022, it was announced that Wilkinson would be writing a feature adaptation of Kevin J. Anderson and Steven L. Sears’ Stalag-X, to be directed by Francis Lawrence.

In 2020, her directorial debut, the period short film Ma'am, was released. It won at the Emerging Talent Awards at the New Renaissance Film Festival. Wilkinson wrote and directed a follow-up short film, The Everlasting Club in 2021. In 2023, Wilkinson began production on her feature film debut, the low-budget thriller 7 Keys.

Filmography

References

External links
 Official Website
 

Living people
21st-century British women writers
British soap opera writers
British television writers
British women dramatists and playwrights
British women film directors
Women soap opera writers
British women television writers
Women science fiction and fantasy writers
Year of birth missing (living people)
Writers of Doctor Who novels